The 2022–23 Bucknell Bison men's basketball team represented Bucknell University in the 2022–23 NCAA Division I men's basketball season. The Bison, led by eighth-year head coach Nathan Davis, played their home games at Sojka Pavilion in Lewisburg, Pennsylvania as members of the Patriot League. They finished the season 12–20, 5–13 in Patriot League play to finish in last place. They lost to American in the first round of the Patriot League tournament.

Previous season
The Bison finished the 2021–22 season 9–23, 5–13 in Patriot League play to finish tied for last place. As the 9 seed, they defeated 8 seed Lafayette in overtime in the first round of the Patriot League Tournament, before falling to top-seeded Colgate in the quarterfinals.

Roster

Schedule and results

|-
!colspan=12 style=| Non-conference regular season

|-
!colspan=12 style=| Patriot League regular season

|-
!colspan=9 style=| Patriot League tournament

Sources

References

Bucknell Bison men's basketball seasons
Bucknell Bison
Bucknell Bison men's basketball
Bucknell Bison men's basketball